Administrative Training Institute, Mysore is a major federally funded training organization of the Government of Karnataka located in Mysore, India. V. Manjula IAS is the current Director General.

From 2002 to 2006, Anita Kaul was the Director General of the Institute.

Facilities
ATI, Mysore has a campus of 35 acres on the foothills of Chamundi hills near the Karanji lake.  The State Institute for Urban Development is inside the same campus.  ATI is the apex training organization of the provincial government.  Being a nationally important and prestigious organization, ATI Mysore also conducts training for federal officers of IAS, IPS and IFS cadres.  ATI Mysore has an auditorium that can accommodate 70 trainees.

SIRD Mysore
Abdul Nasir Sab State Institute of Rural Development or A.N.S.S.I.R.D. is a campus inside ATI, Mysore funded by the Government of Karnataka.  This second organization gives training to local body employees.

ATI Library
The library inside the campus has 55,000 government records and other study material.

Hostels
ATI Mysore has hostel facility for 165 trainees.

See also
 Mysore East

References

Government of Karnataka
Universities and colleges in Mysore
Organisations based in Mysore
Educational institutions in India with year of establishment missing